City Economic Herald, also known as Chengshi Jingji Daobao, is a Xi'an-based newspaper published in simplified Chinese in the People's Republic of China. The newspaper was inaugurated on June 18, 1988, and its predecessor was Northwest Industry and Commerce Newspaper (西北工商报), which was originally jointly sponsored by the Bureau of Industry and Commerce of the Five Northwestern Provinces (西北五省工商局).

In December 1999, Northwest Industry and Commerce Newspaper was transferred to the management of Xi'an Daily Agency, and the paper was renamed City Economic Herald on 16 August 2000.

Suspended for rectification
The City Economic Herald has been suspended for rectification since April 2018, and officially resumed publication on January 15, 2019. According to a staff of the editorial office of the paper, the reason for the newspaper's suspension for rectification was the "regulation of the public opinion environment" (舆论环境整治).

References

Newspapers published in Asia
Publications established in 1988
Chinese-language newspapers (Simplified Chinese)